China national bandy team represents the People's Republic of China in international bandy and is governed by the China Bandy Federation. It made its World Championship debut in the 2015 Bandy World Championship, where they ended up in eighth place among nine teams in Group B. It played in the tournaments 2016, 2017 and 2018 as well. 2018 its Division, B, was played at home, in Harbin.

Tournament participation

World Championships

External links
 China - Somalia game of 3 Feb 2015 at YouTube from the 2015 Bandy World Championship (the game starts about 5:10 in)

Bandy in China
National bandy teams
Bandy